Maxvorstadt (Central Bavarian: Maxvorstod) is a central borough of Munich, Bavaria, Germany and forms the Stadtbezirk (borough) 3 Maxvorstadt. Since 1992, this borough comprises the former boroughs 5, 6 and 7 (Maxvorstadt-Universität, Maxvorstadt-Königsplatz-Marsfeld and Maxvorstadt-Josephsplatz).

Location

The borough is next to the north-western part of the Old City. The Englischer Garten is the Eastern border, Schwabing is in the North, Neuhausen-Nymphenburg in the North-West. The borough Schwanthalerhöhe is its south-western neighbor and Ludwigsvorstadt-Isarvorstadt is in the south. The Eastern parts of Maxvorstadt are often mistakenly attributed to the borough of Schwabing.

Traffic

The Maxvorstadt is drafted as a quadratical grid and is shaped by the north-south axes Schleißheimer Straße and Ludwigstraße; the parallel streets Amalienstraße, Türkenstraße, Barer Straße, Schraudolphstraße, Arcisstraße, Luisenstraße and Augustenstraße run between them. These two main streets are linked by the east-west connections Gabelsbergerstraße, Theresienstraße, Heßstraße, Schellingstraße, Zieblandstraße, Görresstraße and Georgenstraße, Theresienstraße and Gabelsbergerstraße are one-way streets.

The Maxvorstadt is accessible by public transport by the underground line U2 and the stations Königsplatz, Theresienstraße and Josephsplatz, the underground lines U3 and U6 and the station Universität and also the underground line U1 and the station Stiglmaierplatz. Additionally, the tram lines 16, 17, 20, 21, 27 and 28 as well as several bus lines are running here.

Notable landmarks

8. November 1939 (Denkmal)
Abtei St. Bonifaz (Munich)
Akademie der Bildenden Künste München
Akademiegalerie
Alter Botanischer Garten (Munich)
Alter Nordfriedhof (Munich)
Altstadtring
Altstadtringtunnel
Amerikanisches Generalkonsulat in München
Architekturmuseum der Technischen Universität München
Arnold & Richter Cine Technik
Augenklinik Herzog Carl Theodor
Bahnhof München Hackerbrücke
Bayerische Staatskanzlei
Bayerisches Kriegsministerium
Bennosäule
Bernheimer-Haus
Braunes Haus
Bundestagswahlkreis München-Nord
Dachauer Straße
Delphinbrunnen (Munich)
Denkmal für Franz Xaver Gabelsberger (Munich)
Dichtergarten (Munich)
Die Neue Sammlung
Königliche Erzgießerei in München
Führerbau
Gabriel Filmtheater
Geologisches Museum München
Glaspalast (Munich)
Hackerbrücke
Harmlos
Hochschule für Musik und Theater München
Hochschule für Philosophie München
Hochschule für Politik München
Hofbrunnwerkkanal
Hofgartenkaserne
Institut français (Munich)
Justizpalast (Munich)
Kaim-Saal
Karstadt München Bahnhofplatz
Kleines Spiel
Königliche Kunstgewerbeschule München
Königsplatz (Munich)
Circus Krone
Kronebau
Kunstsammlung des Herzoglichen Georgianums
Landeskirchenamt München
Lenbachplatz
Löwenbräukeller
Maillingerstraße
Marsfeld (Munich)
Max-Planck-Institut für Sozialrecht und Sozialpolitik
Münchner Haus der Kulturinstitute
Münchner Theater für Kinder
Museum für Abgüsse Klassischer Bildwerke
Neptunbrunnen (Munich)
Nornenbrunnen (Munich)
NS-Dokumentationszentrum
Odeon (Munich)
Odeonsplatz
Erich Ott
Prinz-Carl-Palais
Propyläen (Munich)
Richard-Wagner-Straße (Munich)
Rundfunkplatz
Salzstadelkaserne
Schauspiel München
Schelling-Salon
Schleißheimer Straße (Munich)
Siegestor
SiemensForum München
Simpl (Munich)
SportA
Sprachen & Dolmetscher Institut München
St. Benno (Munich)
St. Joseph (Munich)
St. Markus (Munich)
St.-Benno-Viertel
Staatliche Antikensammlungen
Staatsarchiv München
Städtische Galerie im Lenbachhaus
Städtisches Luisengymnasium München
Stimmkreis München-Schwabing
The Charles Hotel
Theater Die Kleine Freiheit
TheaterRaum München
Türkengraben
Türkenkaserne
U-Bahnhof Josephsplatz
U-Bahnhof Königsplatz
U-Bahnhof Stiglmaierplatz
U-Bahnhof Theresienstraße
Winzererstraße
Wittelsbacher-Gymnasium München
Wittelsbacherbrunnen (Lenbachplatz)
Wohnhaus Reinemann
Wohnheimsiedlung Maßmannplatz
Zentraler Omnibusbahnhof München

See also

 
Boroughs of Munich